The Eisner Award for Best Penciller/Inker or Penciller/Inker Team is an award for "creative achievement" in American comic books. It is awarded to an individual or team involved with pencilling and inking a comic.

Award merging and name changes
In 1993 two awards were given out: "Best Penciller/Inker, Black & White Publication" and "Best Penciller/Inker, Color Publication." These awards were merged in 1994 after one year. Since then the official name of the award has changed depending on the nominees. It has been "Best Penciller/Inker" 5 times (1996, 2005, 2006, 2013, 2015) and "Best Penciller/Inker or Penciller/Inker Team" 22 times (1994-1995, 1997–2004, 2007–2012, 2014, 2016–present).

Related awards
The Eisner Awards have presented separate awards for "Best Penciller" and "Best Inker," though neither has been awarded since the 1990s.

Winners and nominees

Best Penciller/Inker, Black & White Publication

Best Penciller/Inker, Color Publication

Best Penciller/Inker or Penciller/Inker Team

Multiple awards and nominations

The following individuals have won Best Penciller/Inker or Penciller/Inker Team two or more times. When an individual has won or been nominated as part of a team that has been noted.

The following individuals have received two or more nominations but never won Best Penciller/Inker or Penciller/Inker Team. When an individual has been nominated as part of a team that has been noted.

Notes

References

Penciller/Inker
1993 establishments in the United States
1994 establishments in the United States
Annual events in the United States
Awards established in 1993
Awards established in 1994